Sadaf Manzil is the name of a four-storey residential building in Nagpada, Mumbai which collapsed on 23 August 2005 killing 11 residents and leaving 24 others injured. It was a 100-year-old building; the area including it passed an inspection by two MHADA engineers three days before the collapse. The engineers were convicted of negligence charges in 2008 and each sentenced to a 4.5 year prison sentence.

References

History of Mumbai (1947–present)
Buildings and structures in Mumbai
2005 in India